The District No. 2 School is a historic schoolhouse at Pleasant Street and Caribou Road in Passadumkeag, Maine.  Built in the 1840s as a school, it later served as a church, town hall, and library.  It is now a museum operated by the local historical society, and was listed on the National Register of Historic Places in 1997.

Description and history
The District No. 2 School is located in Passadumkeag Village, at the northeast corner of Pleasant Street and Caribou Road, a short way east of Main Street (United States Route 2).  It is a single-story wood frame structure, with a gable roof, clapboard siding, and a rubblestone foundation.  Its main facade has a hip-roofed porch sheltering the entrance, supported by clustered columns.  The entrance is flanked by fixed-sash windows, with a movable sash window in the gable above the porch.  A square tower rises above the entrance, with a louvered belfry topped by a small spire surrounded by a pinnacled balustrade.  The interior is composed of a large main room, which occupies the front two-thirds of the building, and a smaller room at the rear.

The schoolhouse was built sometime in the 1840s, and served the town's district encompassing its village center until 1902.  It also served as a meeting place for local Baptist and Congregational churches until c. 1905.  In 1915 the building was converted for use as a library, at which time the porch and interior room layout were added.  Between 1946 and 1968 it was again used as a school, and in 1971 it was sold by the town and converted into a private residence.  In 1986 the town bought it back, and gave it to the local historical society, which has restored it and established its museum there.

See also
National Register of Historic Places listings in Penobscot County, Maine

References

School buildings on the National Register of Historic Places in Maine
Greek Revival architecture in Maine
Gothic Revival architecture in Maine
Buildings and structures completed in 1843
Museums in Penobscot County, Maine
National Register of Historic Places in Penobscot County, Maine